Kerrie Ann Keogh (born 3 December 1977), known as Kerri Ann, is an Irish pop singer and actress.

Early life and education
Kerrie Ann Keogh grew up in Tallaght.

Career

Keogh's first single, "Do You Love Me Boy?", reached #2 in Ireland, while the follow-up, "Irreplaceable", reached #1. She was managed by Louis Walsh.

Personal and later life
In 2006 Keogh was working as a personal stylist with Katie Price. As of 2017, she was working for M&M Production Management.

References

1977 births
20th-century Irish women singers
Irish pop singers
Irish film actresses
Living people
Musicians from Dublin (city)
21st-century Irish women singers